KGY may refer to:

 K237FR, a radio station licensed to Tumwater, Washington which uses the slogan "Olympia's 95.3 KGY"
 KBUP, a radio station (1240 AM) licensed to serve Olympia, Washington, which held the call sign KGY from 1922 to 2014
 KYYO, a radio station (96.9 FM) licensed to serve McCleary, Washington, which held the call sign KGY-FM from 1992 to 2013
 kGy, kilogray, an SI unit of absorbed radiation
 the IATA airport code for Kingaroy Airport, Queensland, Australia
 US Library of Congress Classification:Class K -- Law for the Turks and Caicos Islands